Richard McGregor (born 1958) is an Australian journalist, writer, and author. He is currently working as a Senior Fellow at the Lowey Insititute based in Sydney, Australia. He previously was based in Japan and also other locations such as Shanghai, Taiwan, Sydney, Melbourne, Washington, D.C., and London.

Life
Richard McGregor was born in Sydney, Australia. He has worked as a journalist in Taiwan, Sydney, Canberra and Melbourne, and was the chief political correspondent, Japan correspondent, and China correspondent for The Australian. He also worked for the International Herald Tribune, the BBC and the Far Eastern Economic Review, and is the former bureau chief for the Financial Times.

McGregor wrote The Party: The Secret World of China's Communist Rulers, published by Allen Lane from Penguin Press in the UK and HarperCollins in the US in June 2010.

He lived in London, and moved to Washington, D.C., in 2011, to be the Financial Times bureau chief.

He appeared on the Charlie Rose show on 18 January 2011 to discuss Chinese President Hu Jintao's visit to Washington, D.C.; and on 6 September 2017 to discuss Asian, especially Chinese-Japanese, international relations, and the United States' role in Asia.

Notable works 
 Japan Swings : Politics, Culture and Sex in the New Japan (Allen & Unwin, 1996) 
 The Party: The Secret World of China's Communist Rulers (Allen Lane, 2010) 
 
 Xi Jinping: The Backlash (Penguin Random House Australia, 2019)

Awards
McGregor won the 2010 Society of Publishers in Asia (SOPA) Editorial Excellence Award for reporting on the Xinjiang Riots; and prior to that, the SOPA Award in 2008 for Editorial Intelligences.

References

External links
 From Lowy Institute for International Policy audio presentation by Richard McGregor
 Daily Beast review of The Party

1958 births
Living people
Writers from Sydney
Australian journalists